
Year 770 (DCCLXX) was a common year starting on Monday (link will display the full calendar) of the Julian calendar. The denomination 770 for this year has been used since the early medieval period, when the Anno Domini calendar era became the prevalent method in Europe for naming years.

Events 
<onlyinclude>

By place

Europe 
 King Charlemagne signs a peace treaty with Duke Tassilo III of Bavaria, and marries the Lombard princess Desiderata (daughter of King Desiderius). He travels to the Lombard court at Pavia to conclude arrangements. Pope Stephen III opposes the marriage, and protests about a Frankish-Lombard alliance.
 Hedeby, an important trading settlement, in the Danish-northern German borderland is founded (approximate date).

Britain 
 King Alhred of Northumbria takes an interest in continental missionary activities, and sends Willehad to Frisia in modern-day Netherlands (approximate date).

Abbasid Caliphate 
 Caliph al-Mansur orders the closing of the Canal of the Pharaohs (Egypt). The only remaining land routes to transship camel caravans' goods are from Alexandria to ports on the Red Sea, or the northern Byzantine termini of the Silk Road.

Asia 
 August 28 – Empress Kōken (also Shōtoku) of Japan dies.

Births 
 Ansegisus, Frankish abbot (approximate date)
 Jayavarman II, founder of the Khmer Empire (d. 835)
 Michael I, emperor of the Byzantine Empire (d. 844)
 Michael II, emperor of the Byzantine Empire (d. 829)
 Pepin of Italy, son of Charlemagne (or 773)
 Prokopia, empress of the Byzantine Empire (approximate date)
 Stephen IV, pope of the Catholic Church (approximate date)
 Sugawara no Kiyotomo, Japanese nobleman (d. 842)

Deaths 
 August 28 – Kōken, empress of Japan (b. 718)
 Cennselach mac Brain, king of the Uí Ceinnselaig (Ireland)
 Du Fu, Chinese poet (b. 712)
 Ma'n ibn Za'ida al-Shaybani, Arab general (or 769)
 Modestus, Irish missionary (approximate date)
 Opportuna of Montreuil, Frankish abbess
 Tóim Snáma mac Flainn, king of Osraige (Ireland)

References